Petr Jarchovský (born 6 October 1966 in Prague) is a Czech screenwriter, whose writing credits include Big Beat (1993), Cosy Dens (1999), and Divided We Fall (2000). Jarchovský is a frequent and long-term collaborator with director Jan Hřebejk.

Career
Jarchovský attended high school in Prague and then, from 1987 to 1991, at the Film and TV School of the Academy of Performing Arts in Prague, alongside his high school classmate and future creative collaborator Jan Hřebejk. His screenwriting debut was a collaboration with another classmate, Igor Chaun, on a project entitled Very Believable Stories. Around this time, Jarchovský and Hřebejk also co-wrote a film based on Hřebejk's experiences of socialist summer camps, entitled Let's All Sing A Song, which was later made into a feature film by Ondřej Trojan in his directorial debut.

Jarchovský and Hřebejk's breakthrough came in 1993 with the film Big Beat, a rock and roll comedy set in the 1950s, written by Jarchovský and Hřebejk from a story by Petr Šabach. The film won the Czech Lion award for Best Film in 1993. In 1997 Jarchovský and Hřebejk received awards from the Film and Television Association and the Literary Fund for three episodes they had written for the TV series Bachelors, which were awarded for their contribution to dramatic television programming.

The writing and production team behind Big Beat subsequently reunited for two further films, Cosy Dens (1999) and Divided We Fall (2000), both of which became enormously successful within the Czech Republic. Jarchovský also wrote the screenplay for Želary (2003), directed by Ondrej Trojan, which was nominated for the Academy Award for Best Foreign Language Film in 2004.

Jarchovský also teaches at the Faculty of Screenwriting and Script Editing at FAMU, and works as a script editor for Czech Television.

Filmography

Feature films
 1991: Let's All Sing Around 
 1993: Big Beat (writer) 
 1999: Cosy Dens (writer)  
 2000: Divided We Fall (screenplay) / (story) 
 2000: Out of the City (additional story) 
 2003: Pupendo (writer) 
 2003: Zelary (writer) 
 2004: Up and Down 
 2006: Beauty in Trouble 
 2007: Teddy Bear (screenplay) 
 2008: I'm All Good (screenplay) 
 2009: Kawasaki's Rose (screenplay) 
 2010: Identity Card 
 2011: Innocence (screenplay) 
 2013: Honeymoon 
 2013: Klauni 
 2016: The Teacher 
 Zahradnictví: Nápadník 
 2016: Zlodeji zelených koní
 2017: Zahradnictví: Rodinný prítel 
 2017: Zahradnictví: Dezertér

Television
 1991: Velmi uveritelné príbehy (writer – 1 episode: "Dlazdice" (1991))
 1997: Bakalári (writer – 1 episode: "Dobrá zpráva" (1997))
 1997: Okno (TV Short) 
 2013–2014: Skoda lásky (screenplay – 3 episodes: "S jedním uchem naveselo" (2014); "Úspesný lov" (2014); "Skoda lásky" (2013))
 2014: Ctvrtá hvezda (dramatisation – 1 episode: "Hodina H." (2014))
 2015: Prípad pro exorcistu (TV Mini-Series) (adaptation – 3 episodes: Episode 1.1, 1.2, 1.3 (2015))
 2016: Modré stíny (TV Mini-Series) (Episodes 1–4 (2016)) 
 2016: Pet mrtvých psu (TV Mini-Series) (writer – episodes 1–3 (2016))

References

External links
 Petr Jarchovsky at the Internet Movie Database
 Petr Jarchovsky at the Czechoslovak Film Database

1966 births
Living people
Czech screenwriters
Male screenwriters
Writers from Prague
Academy of Performing Arts in Prague alumni